The 1938 Detroit Tigers season was a season in American baseball. The Detroit Tigers compiled a record of 84 wins and 70 losses, good enough for fourth place in the American League. Hank Greenberg hit 58 home runs, and became the first unanimous selection as the American League MVP.

Offseason 
 December 2, 1937: Mike Tresh, Marv Owen and Gee Walker were traded by the Tigers to the Chicago White Sox for Vern Kennedy, Tony Piet, and Dixie Walker.

Regular season 
The highlight of the 1938 season was first baseman Hank Greenberg challenging the single-season home run record held by Babe Ruth (60). Hank went into the season's final weekend against the Cleveland Indians with 58 home runs, but failed to homer on Saturday or Sunday. He did tie Jimmie Foxx's record for a right-handed hitter, set in 1932.

Season standings

Record vs. opponents

Roster

Player stats

Batting

Starters by position 
Note: Pos = Position; G = Games played; AB = At bats; H = Hits; Avg. = Batting average; HR = Home runs; RBI = Runs batted in

Other batters 
Note: G = Games played; AB = At bats; H = Hits; Avg. = Batting average; HR = Home runs; RBI = Runs batted in

Pitching

Starting pitchers 
Note: G = Games pitched; IP = Innings pitched; W = Wins; L = Losses; ERA = Earned run average; SO = Strikeouts

Other pitchers 
Note: G = Games pitched; IP = Innings pitched; W = Wins; L = Losses; ERA = Earned run average; SO = Strikeouts

Relief pitchers 
Note: G = Games pitched; W = Wins; L = Losses; SV = Saves; ERA = Earned run average; SO = Strikeouts

Awards and honors 
Hank Greenberg finished third in the American League MVP voting.

Farm system 

LEAGUE CHAMPIONS: Beaumont, Beckley, Harlingen

Notes

External links 

1938 Detroit Tigers season at Baseball Reference

Detroit Tigers seasons
Detroit Tigers season
Detroit Tigers
1938 in Detroit